The 2020–21 ASVEL Basket season will be the 72nd season in the existence of the club. The club will play in the LNB Pro A and in the EuroLeague.

Players

Squad information

Players with multiple nationalities

Depth chart

Transactions

In

Out

References

External links
 Official website 

ASVEL Basket seasons
ASVEL
ASVEL